Michael G. "Mickey" Heinecken (born January 25, 1939) is a former American football, lacrosse, and tennis coach. He served as the head football coach at Middlebury College from 1973 to 2000, compiling  a record of 126–96–2.  He has the most wins and longest tenure of any head coach in the history of the Middlebury Panthers football program. In his final season, Heinecken guided the Panthers to a New England Small College Athletic Conference (NESCAC) co-championship. Heinecken played college football at the University of Delaware from 1958 to 1960.

Head coaching record

Football

References

1939 births
Living people
Delaware Fightin' Blue Hens football coaches
Delaware Fightin' Blue Hens football players
Delaware Fightin' Blue Hens men's lacrosse coaches
Middlebury Panthers football coaches
College tennis coaches in the United States